In 2019 in the sport of athletics, the foremost 100 metres races were held at the 2019 World Athletics Championships. In the men's World Championships final the American Christian Coleman won his first world title with a time of 9.76 seconds. In the women's World Championships final Jamaica's Shelly-Ann Fraser-Pryce won her fourth world 100 m title with a time of 10.71 seconds. 

In the 2019 Diamond League global series of meetings, American Noah Lyles won the men's final and Great Britain's Dina Asher-Smith won the women's final. Regional 100 m titles decided that year included the Universiade, African Games, Pan American Games, European Games, Asian Championships, and South American Championships. The 2019 World Para Athletics Championships featured 100 m finals in 17 men's and 15 women's categories.

Both World Championships winning times were the fastest recorded in the men's and women's divisions that year. No senior world or continental records in the 100 m were beaten in 2019. Significant national records set that year included Abdul Hakim Sani Brown's run of 9.97 seconds for the men's Japanese record and Dina Asher-Smith's women's British record of 10.83.

In the under-20 age category, Lalu Muhammad Zohri was the fastest man that year with 10.03 (a senior Indonesian record) and  Sha'Carri Richardson of the United States was the fastest under-20 woman with 10.75 (a world under-20 record and third in the senior rankings). In the under-18 category, Jamaicans Briana Williams (11.02) and Conroy Jones (10.32) were the fastest that year.

Coleman's world title generated some controversy as he had successfully appealed a doping ban by the United States Anti-Doping Agency that season due to his missing three tests within a twelve-month period.

International gold medalists

Records

Men top 60

Women top 60

See also
 2020 in 100 metres

References

External links
 

2019
100 metres